The Bo are an ethnic group of Laos. The Bo population primarily spread throughout Bolikhamxai and Khammouane provinces, Central Laos.

Synopsis and status
"Bo" simply means "mine." This implies that the Bo were originally a miner tribe of Kha (Mon-Khmer) origins. It is unclear whether the Bo are qualified to be an recognized ethnic group due to their overlapping identity.

There are two branches of the Bo: The Tai Bo of the Hinboun River speak Lao while the Kha Bo of Nakai Plateau speak Nyo. Both were used to be Vietic speakers but had recently switched to speak Tai languages during the First Indochina War.

Tai Bo and Kha Bo elderly still could speak a language variant that are believed to be related or close to either Kri or Maleng language.

Footnotes

Vietic peoples
Ethnic groups in Laos